Dyschirius brevispinus is a species of ground beetle in the subfamily Scaritinae. It was described by John Lawrence LeConte in 1878.

References

brevispinus
Beetles described in 1878